The Christian Peoples Alliance (CPA) is a Christian rightist political party in the United Kingdom. The party was founded in its present form in 1999, having grown out of a cross-party advocacy group called the Movement for Christian Democracy. The first leader of the party was Ram Gidoomal; Alan Craig took over from him in 2004 and resigned in 2012, later defecting to the UK Independence Party (UKIP). He was replaced by Sidney Cordle, the party's current leader.

History

Movement for Christian Democracy
The beginnings of the party can be traced to the Movement for Christian Democracy (MCD), a movement founded in 1990 with the aim to combat rising secularism within the United Kingdom. The three founding members were David Alton, Derek Enright and Ken Hargreaves, who were Members of Parliament representing the Liberal, Labour and Conservative parties respectively. Though political parties with explicitly Christian aims and values had been previously established within the United Kingdom, such as the Protestant Unionist Party (PUP) in Northern Ireland, the MCD, unlike the PUP, claimed to represent both Protestants and Catholics on a nationwide, rather than regionally-based, basis.

The MCD existed as a cross-party advocacy group and never became a fully-fledged political party. However, many of its members later sought to form the CPA; the movement's chairman, Dr. Alan Storkey, and its vice-chairman, David Campanale, formed the CPA in 1999 following an internal consultation of MCD members.

Formation of the Christian Peoples Alliance
Following the devolution of the Scottish Parliament and the Welsh Assembly, elements of proportional representation at a local government level saw the party gain confidence. In 2000, Ram Gidoomal, a convert from Hinduism to Christianity, became the party's leader.

Gidoomal stood for election in the 2000 London mayoral election, gaining 98,549 votes and finishing fifth, ahead of the Greens in first preference votes. The party campaigned on job opportunities for Londoners, amongst other policies. In November that  year, a candidate supported by the Christian Peoples Alliance stood at the Preston by-election, finishing seventh.

Craig leadership

Following this, the party continued its campaign work in London, mostly in working class areas, such as Canning Town in Newham. In 2002, Alan Craig became the first Christian Democrat to be elected in Britain, as a member of the local Newham council.

The party's 'Mayflower Declaration' laid out the party's values and policies, voicing its opposition to the prospect of the Iraq War, deeming it "illegal, unwise and immoral" — a position by which it has stood. After the 2004 London mayoral election, Gidoomal stepped down as party leader to be succeeded by Craig. The party stood members for the 2005 general election with little electoral success, though a "blind candidating" contest run by the BBC's Newsnight programme saw members of the public, unaware of the party of each contestant speaking, place the party's manifesto and policies second.

The party had more success in 2006, gaining two more council seats in Canning Town. In the following year, the party had two members elected at parish council level for Aston cum Aughton in the Metropolitan Borough of Rotherham. In the same year, it also gained encouragement from Scottish Catholic bishops Keith O'Brien and Philip Tartaglia for its social stances, including its stance on marriage, rights for unborn children and supporting the Church in the adoption debate. The party also defended the Anglican bishop Michael Nazir-Ali after comments he made in the media regarding Islam.

As part of a party pact with the Christian Party, Craig stood for the London mayoral election in 2008 as "The Christian Choice", gaining almost 3% of the vote. This was followed with 249,493 votes at the European Parliament election 2009, 1.6% of the total.

Abbey Hills Mosque
The CPA campaigned against the building of the Abbey Mills Mosque in West Ham, planned to have been built by a sect of Islam which the CPA claimed was a "radical sect". The party's broadcast in relation to the planning was censored on both the BBC and on ITV, leading to the CPA taking unsuccessful legal action. A 23-year-old man from Stevenage posted a death threat on YouTube in response to the group's opposition to the mosque's construction. The party claimed the planned mosque was an "unwanted landmark", stating its belief that the construction would "undermine community cohesion". A petition on the official Downing Street website to prevent the mosque's construction gained more than 255,000 signatures, claiming that the mosque would "cause terrible violence".

Craig resignation
Craig resigned as leader in October 2012 and later joined the UK Independence Party.

Targeting of Stella Creasy 
In the 2019 general election campaign, The Guardian reported that the CPA would have 30 candidates and that the party had admitted that its primary ambition was to unseat the pro-abortion rights Labour MP Stella Creasy, who was heavily pregnant at the time. This followed a similar targeting of Creasy in October 2019 by the UK arm of the US anti-abortion group, the Center for Bio-Ethical Reform, which had led the police to pass a file to the Crown Prosecution Service to consider whether its campaign constituted an offence of harassment.

The CPA finished last in the Walthamstow constituency with less than 1% of the vote, losing its deposit.

Organisation 
Annual accounts submitted to the Electoral Commission show an income of £11,000 for 2013.

Leadership

International affiliation 
Since 2007, the party has been affiliated to the European Christian Political Movement, an association of Christian Democrat parties, think tanks and politicians across Europe.

Ideology
The party has campaigned on a range of issues, winning success in 2000 when it organised a petition against government plans to require Asian visitors to the UK to place a £10,000 'bond'. In 2000 and 2004 in London, it put inner-city regeneration and fighting discrimination, as its top policy priorities. Its policies to cut energy-use and road congestion through a motorway coach-network won acceptance at government level. Its policies in support of marriage and church schools have become popular currency among secular parties.
The CPA has also opposed the reclassification of cannabis, When Craig became leader he introduced policies in favour of linking Christianity to the European Union Constitution, building more church schools and supporting 5th century Christian morality. He also has led campaigns backing the UNISON steward at Newham Council who faced disciplinary action; against plans to build London's large casino in Newham, against the Excel Arms Fair; against what he claims are Labour's plans to move local families out of Canning Town in support of yuppie housing. Craig has also campaigned against proposals to demolish parts of Queen Street Market in favour of "non-invasive refurbishment" environment.

The CPA has contested local authority elections at parish, borough, city and county level in London, Glasgow, Sheffield, Leeds, Rotherham, Middlesbrough, Ipswich, Gloucester, Northampton and Suffolk. Since Cordle became leader, the party has focused more on putting up candidates in national elections and developing a comprehensive manifesto covering all issues of concern to them, such as abortion and adoption rights. The party fought three regions in the 2014 European Parliament elections and they had 17 candidates in the 2015 general election and 31 in the 2017 one, a record number of losses for the party.

Same-sex marriage
The party was involved in the campaign against the Marriage (Same Sex Couples) Act 2013 with its leader Sid Cordle speaking at a rally in Trafalgar Square. While the debates were taking place he spoke at a rally outside Westminster.  

In May 2014, during the EU elections, under questioning from Andrew Neil on the BBC Daily Politics programme Cordle said that it was possible that recent storms in the UK could have been caused by God, saying, "I think all Christians believe that God does, and can do, things with nature. A lot of Christians believe God is angry over 'gay marriage' and God can show that anger if he wants to."

In May 2017, on the Daily Politics programme, Cordle was accused of "embarrassing" himself and was described as a "bigot" by the journalist Owen Jones after claiming that marriage's sole purpose was the procreation of children. The presenter, Jo Coburn, was forced to ask Cordle to allow Jones to speak on several occasions, but Cordle accused Jones of being "insulting" and claimed that Coburn's reluctance to allow him to respond to Jones was "fake news".

Economic and European policy
The Christian Peoples Alliance rejects class struggle doctrine and supports a mixed market economy, with an emphasis on the community, social solidarity, support for social welfare provision and some regulation of market forces. The central theme being social justice, responsible charity and an emphasis on "people before profit". Within the Mayflower Declaration the party sets out as goals and desires; providing resources to discourage economic dependency and promote gainful employment. A holistic approach to care, which moves beyond mere financial assistance, as well as help for those in danger of being pushed to the margins of society, like the homeless and disabled. The Mayflower Declaration was updated and reprinted in early 2013 just after Cordle became leader. It now has a new introduction and at the back the policy on Europe was changed from support for the EU to "While we are members of the European Union to work with fellow Christians to seek to bring about moral and democratic reform." It subsequently went further and in its 2014 European manifesto said it wanted a referendum on the EU and that if a referendum was held it would support leaving the EU.

Election results
The party has never won a seat as a Member of Parliament. However, it has won some local government council elections. In Newham London Borough Council, Alan Craig was a councillor (2002-2010), as were Simeon Ademolake (2006–2010) and Denise Stafford (2006–2010). Paul Martin and David Gee were elected to Aston-cum-Aughton Parish Council (2007–2009).

House of Commons

Thirty-one candidates stood for the CPA in the 2017 general election. The party contested by-elections in 2017, 2018, 2019 and 2021, and is doing so in 2022. The party stood 27 candidates in the 2019 general election.

London Assembly

† In 2008 the CPA fielded Joint-ticket candidates with the Christian Party, standing as "Christian Choice"

The party has consistently contested elections to the London Assembly but failed to gain any seats.

See also
Christian Concern
Christian Institute
Christian Party
Christianity and politics
Jubilee Centre
ProLife Alliance (1997–2004)

Notes

References

Bibliography

External links

Social conservative parties
Eurosceptic parties in the United Kingdom
Opposition to same-sex marriage
Political parties established in 1999
Right-wing parties in the United Kingdom
Christian political parties in the United Kingdom
1999 establishments in the United Kingdom
European Christian Political Movement